Mohamed G. Gouda is an American computer scientist, currently the Mike A. Myers Centennial Professor at University of Texas at Austin.

References

Year of birth missing (living people)
Living people
University of Texas at Austin faculty
York University alumni
American computer scientists